Graham Duncan can refer to:

 Graham Duncan (botanist) (born 1959), South African botanist
 Graham Duncan (cricketer) (born 1947), New Zealand cricketer
 Graham Duncan (footballer) (born 1969), Scottish footballer